Lambda Upsilon Lambda (ΛΥΛ) or La Unidad Latina has 74 undergraduate chapters and fifteen graduate/professional chapters. The first undergraduate chapter was founded in Cornell University on February 19, 1982. Meanwhile, the first graduate/professional chapter was established in Rensselaer Polytechnic Institute on November 14, 1998. The honorary Pi Sigma chapter is reserved for deceased members of the fraternity.

Naming convention
Greek-lettered chapters of Lambda Upsilon Lambda are given names consisting of either one or two Greek letters after successfully transitioning from provisional chapter status. The names are issued in order according to the dates on which the chapters are transitioned from their provisional phase. Alpha is the name given to the founding chapter at Cornell University, followed by Beta at Binghamton University for the second chapter, and so on in the Greek alphabet. Chapters beginning with the Greek letter Gamma are reserved for graduate alumni professional chapters, with the first being the Gamma Alpha chapter based in New York City.

Once the Greek alphabet had been exhausted by using single letters at the undergraduate level except Gamma, two-letter names began to be issued except the combination of Pi Sigma and any combination starting with Gamma, starting with Alpha Alpha, then Alpha Beta, then Alpha Gamma, etc. The honorary Pi Sigma chapter and its Greek letter combination as a result is reserved for deceased brothers of Lambda Upsilon Lambda due to it having the same starting letters with the latter two words of the fraternity's motto "La Unidad Para Siempre".

Undergraduate chapters
Following are the undergraduate chapters of Lambda Upsilon Lambda. Active chapters are indicated in bold. Inactive chapters are indicated in italic.

Notes

Graduate alumni professional chapters 
Following are the graduate alumni professional chapters of Lambda Upsilon Lambda. Active chapters are indicated in bold. Inactive chapters are indicated in italic.

References

Lambda Upsilon Lambda
Hispanic and Latino organizations